The Air Cargo Challenge is an aeronautical engineering competition that is held in Europe every two years.

This competition was held for the first time in 2003 and it was founded by a group of Aerospace students in Lisbon. The competition is primarily directed to aeronautical and aerospace engineering students, similarly to the north-American Design/Build/Fly.

The main objective is to design and build a radio-controlled aircraft that is able to fly with the highest possible payload according with the rules established in the competition regulations, which vary in each edition.
The team's score is not only given by the performance demonstrated in the flight competition part, but also by the technical quality of the project, through the evaluation of the design report and drawings.

The event's first edition (ACC'03) was organized by the APAE: Associação Portuguesa de Aeronáutica e Espaço (Portuguese Association of Aeronautics and Space), an aerospace group from Instituto Superior Técnico. From the ACC'07 onwards, the competition grew to an international level under the umbrella of EUROAVIA, the European Association of Aerospace Students, and the winning team got the possibility of organizing the next edition. The ACC of 2011 was held in the University of Stuttgart, August 2011, organized by the AKAModell Stuttgart together with the EUROAVIA Stuttgart. The Universidade da Beira Interior was the winner of this edition, thus it took place in Portugal'. Again, the Team from Stuttgart won this Edition, and got the organization responsibility. In 2017 the 2015 winner HUSZ organized the event in Zagreb. The competition took place in Stuttgart again on August 12-17, 2019. The last competition was held in Munich in the summer of 2022 after a one year delay due to the Covid pandemic. The next ACC 2024 will be held in Aachen, Germany.

Competition results

2003 - Organization: APAE, Lisbon

2005 - Organization: APAE, Lisbon

2007 - Organization: Instituto Superior Técnico, Lisbon

2009 - Organization: University of Beira Interior, Covilhã

2011 - Organization: University of Stuttgart, Stuttgart

2013 - Organization: University of Beira Interior, Covilhã

2015 - Organization: University of Stuttgart, Stuttgart

2017 - Organization: University of Zagreb, Zagreb

2019 - Organization: University of Stuttgart, Stuttgart

2022 - Organization: AkaModell München e.V., Technical University of Munich Munich 
The 2021 edition of the ACC was delayed to 2022 due to the Covid pandemic. It was organized by AkaModell München from Technical University of Munich.
All information to the ACC2022 can be found on www.acc2022.de.
The competition took place 5.7.2022-9.7.2022 in Munich. 
The regulations were released on August 6, 2020.

Statistics

Number of participated Teams per Country (2007-2022)

Medal table (2007-2022)

References

External links
 https://web.archive.org/web/20110723004649/http://aircargochallenge.net/portal/ 
 https://web.archive.org/web/20101227010310/http://www.acc2011.com/
 https://web.archive.org/web/20130522142129/http://apae.org.pt/
 https://web.archive.org/web/20081204102043/http://aircargochallenge.net/portal/finalResults.pdf
 www.upcventuri.com
 https://web.archive.org/web/20190805114405/http://www.acc2017.com/

Aeronautics
Engineering competitions
Engineering education
European student organizations
International aviation organizations
Student competitions